Renaissance College of Commerce and Management (/rɪˈneɪsns/) was established in 2006. RCCM is a modern College for commerce and management education, located in Indore, the commercial capital of Madhya Pradesh. It inherits the concept of Gurukul.

References 

Educational institutions established in 2006
Schools in Indore
Business schools in Madhya Pradesh
2006 establishments in Madhya Pradesh